Ambassador is in charge of the Embassy of India, Luanda. Pratibha Parkar is the current Ambassador of India to Angola.

The following people have served as Ambassadors of India to Angola.

Ambassador of India to Angola

See also
 Embassy of India, Luanda

References 

Ambassadors of India to Angola
India
Angola
https://www.mea.gov.in/press-releases.htm?dtl/29373/Srikumar_Menon_appointed_as_the_next_Ambassador_of_India_to_the_Republic_of_Angola